Paul Poaniewa (born 8 November 1953) is a retired French athlete. He competed in the men's high jump at the 1976 Summer Olympics.

References

1953 births
Living people
Athletes (track and field) at the 1976 Summer Olympics
French male high jumpers
Olympic athletes of France
New Caledonian male athletes
People from Nouméa
Universiade silver medalists for France
Universiade medalists in athletics (track and field)